King George Central is a skyscraper in Brisbane, Queensland, Australia. The modern style office building is located next to Ann Street Presbyterian Church in the Golden Triangle and the emerging North Quarter Precinct of the Brisbane central business district in close proximity to the King George Square and Queen Elizabeth II Courts of Law. The building was constructed by Thiess Contractors and completed in 2012.

See also

 List of tallest buildings in Brisbane

References

External links

King George Central at Thiess website
King George Central at Leighton website
145 Ann Street at ML Design

Skyscrapers in Brisbane
Office buildings in Brisbane
Office buildings completed in 2012
Modernist architecture in Australia
2012 establishments in Australia
Ann Street, Brisbane
Skyscraper office buildings in Australia